WCF may refer to:

Organizations
 Washington Commonwealth Federation (1934–1948), a political organization in the American state of Washington
 World Capoeira Federation, an international organization for the sport of capoeira
 World Cat Federation, an international association of cat clubs
 World Cocoa Foundation
 World Congress of Families, a Christian conservative organization
 World Croquet Federation, and organization that encourages, promotes and develops the recognised versions of the game of croquet internationally
 World Curling Federation, the world governing body for curling accreditation, with offices in Perth, Scotland
 Western Conference Finals (disambiguation), the finals of the western conference playoff in the NBA (National Basketball Association) or NHL (National Hockey League)

Information Technology
 Windows Communication Foundation, a framework for building service-oriented application software.
 WCF Data Services, a data service framework released as a complement to WCF.

Other
 Waterloo – Cedar Falls metropolitan area, a statistical area in Iowa
 Westminster Confession of Faith, a 1646 doctrinal statement from a branch of Protestant Christianity
 William Coles Finch, English author who signed his sketches "W.C.F."
 Winchester rifle, known as Winchester Center Fire
 World Cinema Fund, a fund associated with the Berlin International Film Festival which assists film projects in poorer countries
 World Cultural Festival, a festival held in New Delhi, India, in 2016